Nana Means King is a 2015 Ghanaian film directed and produced by Nana Obiri Yeboah.

Plot
Nana Kwame, a Ghanaian illegal immigrant working in the UK who lost everything to betrayal, finds himself launched on a personal odyssey of self-discovery. Stripped of nearly all material possession, a place to live, and even his dreams of glory, he must find his way through the unfamiliar terrain of the displaced and invisible. It is in this hour of darkness, at his most vulnerable, his life takes an unexpected turn when he finds beauty and love growing in the concrete wasteland. Though the mirror that is Shauna, he quickly realizes the past can be a prison we create for our own minds. It is only by helping to free Shauna from her prison that he is eventually freed from his own.

Cast
 Armah Richard Armah as Chris Kuma
 David Osei as Kwame
 Roxana Zachos as Shauna

Awards

References

External links 
 

2015 films
2015 thriller drama films
British independent films
Films about immigration
Ghanaian independent films
English-language Ghanaian films
2015 drama films
2015 independent films
2010s English-language films
2010s British films